Manuel da Silva Rosa (born 1961) is a Portuguese American writer and independent researcher and lecturer on the life of Christopher Columbus. Rosa has published several controversial books and has been featured in Polish documentaries about Columbus and several other international media outlets.

Life
Rosa was born in Madalena, Pico Island, Portugal in 1961. He and his family emigrated to Boston in 1973.

From 2008 to 2018 he worked as an IT analyst at Duke University.

References

External links
 e-Spanish Legal History Review, N.º 21 JUNIO 2015 http://www.iustel.com/v2/revistas/detalle_revista.asp?id_noticia=416163
 e-Spanish Legal History Review, N.º 19 ENERO 2015 - http://www.iustel.com/v2/revistas/detalle_revista.asp?id_noticia=415524

1961 births
Living people
American non-fiction writers
People from Pico Island
Portuguese emigrants to the United States